Petra Hack (born 1970 in Euskirchen) is a former German model.

In 1991 she was voted to Miss Germany by the Miss Germany Association (MGA). In the same year she reached place three in the Miss Intercontinental vote.

References

1970 births
Living people
People from Euskirchen
German beauty pageant winners